Chapare may refer to:
 Chapare Province, Bolivia
 Chapare River

It may also refer to:
 Chapare virus